The Reserve Infantry Division of Baicheng() was a reserve infantry formation of the People's Liberation Army active between 1982 and 1998.

The formation of the Reserve Division of Baicheng() started from May 1982 in Baicheng, Jilin. The division was then composed of:
1st Regiment - Fuyu
2nd Regiment - Zhenlai County
3rd Regiment - Taoan County
Artillery Regiment - Da'an

As of its activation, the division had 13,464 personnel. Among them, there were 78 cadres (officers) in active service, 1,576 cadres with pre-assigned positions, and 11,810 pre-assigned soldiers.

The division was redesignated as the Reserve Infantry Division of Baicheng() in February 1986.

In August 1986, a Reserve Communications Regiment was activated at Ji'an County and attached to the division. In March 1988, the regiment detached from the division.

In May 1988, the 3rd Infantry Regiment was reactivated at Taonan. By then the division was composed of:
1st Infantry Regiment - Fuyu
2nd Infantry Regiment - Zhenlai County
3rd Infantry Regiment - Taonan
Artillery Regiment - Da'an

In August 1998, the division merged with the 47th Infantry Division as the 47th Reserve Infantry Division of Jilin Provincial Military District.

References

Reserve divisions of the People's Liberation Army
Military units and formations established in 1983